Matraville Refinery was an oil refinery in the Australian state of New South Wales.

Bitumen and Oil Refineries (Australia) Limited (later named by the acronym Boral) commenced construction of Australia's first bitumen and oil refinery in Matraville in March 1947. The company was 40% owned by Caltex which supplied the crude oil to be refined. Most of the early employees were discharged from the Royal Australian Navy. In 1968 Boral sold a 50% stake to Total, before selling it the remainder in January 1972. In 1979, the plant was expanded.

It closed in 1984 and was demolished in 1988.

References

Buildings and structures demolished in 1988
Demolished buildings and structures in New South Wales
Oil refineries in Australia
TotalEnergies
1947 establishments in Australia
1984 disestablishments in Australia